Michael "Vic" Galloway (born 4 August 1972) is a DJ on BBC Radio Scotland. Galloway presents a self-titled show on Radio Scotland every Monday from 9pm to 11pm and also the BBC Introducing Scotland Thursday evenings/Friday mornings from 11pm to 1am.  He presented BBC Scotland's T in the Park television coverage every summer.

BBC Radio
In addition to his regular shows which have been running for over 11 years on BBC Radio, Galloway has presented 2 series of 'Mouthing Off' and 'The Big Scottish Adventure', as well as various documentary series including 'Indie-pendent Scotland', 'The Banned History of Rock'n'Roll', 'Meet the Neighbours' and 'School for Genius'. He has broadcast live shows from the 'T in the Park', 'South by South West',  Indian Summer, 'Live 8' and 'Connect' festivals for the BBC. He has also recently presented the  Radio 1 Rock Show and covered for Marc Riley on BBC Radio 6 Music.

BBC TV
On TV he has presented five years of BBC One and Two's 'T in the Park' coverage, 'The Music Show' on BBC 2, BBC 4's 'Caledonia Dreaming', and Channel 4's 'Transmission'.

Media career
As a freelance journalist, Vic Galloway does regular work for newspapers, magazines and websites, including a weekly music column for 'A-Listed'. He has also written for The List and contributed articles such as "Why more DJs must be like Peel"  to the Sunday Herald. He is often invited to host and MC events, such as 'Burnsong', 'Ballads of The Book' and 'The Scottish Style Awards' in recent years. He also DJs in clubs and universities across the UK and abroad. In 2009–2010 he compered the 'Waverley Stage' as part of Edinburgh's legendary Hogmanay Street Party Celebrations. Galloway also writes a weekly column for the website Dear Scotland which features a listing of every Scottish band touring outside the UK that week.

On 2 November 2010, it was announced that Galloway would be leaving the Radio 1 Introducing show, to be replaced by Ally McCrae of Detour Scotland.

Personal life
Galloway grew up in Kingsbarns and Haddington and achieved three A-levels, two Highers and eight GCSEs. A member of the National Youth Theatre, he played in the bands Miraclehead, Huckleberry and The Deaf Mutes and has also written for fanzines, worked as lighting director and co-ordinator at The Venue in Edinburgh, helped set up the independent Copper Records, and worked as press and radio promoter for Human Condition Records in Edinburgh. He's currently working as a specialist advisor for the Scottish Arts Council as well as writing, performing and producing music of his own.

References

External links
Vic Galloway (BBC Radio Scotland)

1972 births
Living people
BBC Radio Scotland presenters
Scottish DJs
People from Muscat, Oman
National Youth Theatre members
People from Kingsbarns
Electronic dance music DJs